Zoya Spasovkhodskaya (born March 31, 1949) is a former heptathlete from the Soviet Union, who was born as Zoya Baykalova. A winner of the bronze medal at the 1974 European Championships, she set the first world best year performance in 1980, gaining a total number of 6049 points on July 13, 1980 at a meet in Pyatigorsk.

References
All-Time List

1949 births
Living people
Russian heptathletes
Soviet heptathletes
Place of birth missing (living people)
European Athletics Championships medalists